Rodney Barton was the U.S. National Badminton Men's Champion in 1983 and 1984. He attended Palo Alto High School. He is African American.

References 

American male badminton players
African-American sportsmen